Robert's river garfish (Zenarchopterus robertsi) is a species of viviparous halfbeak endemic to Papua New Guinea where it is only known from the area around Kokoda.  This species grows to a length of  SL.

Environment
The Robert's river garfish is known to be found in a freshwater environment within a pelagic depth range. This species lives in a tropical climate. They are known to be found in the biological area of rain forest streams.  The Robert's river garfish lives in the oceania region.

Size
The Robert's river garfish can reach the maximum length of 13 centimeters or about 5.11 inches as an unsexed male.

Distribution
The distribution of the Robert's river garfish includes the areas of Kokoda in southeastern Papua New Guinea.

Information
The Robert's river garfish serves as no threat to humans and they are considered to be harmless. This species does not have the ability to live in an aquarium or for commercial use. They can only live in freshwater and are unable to live in saltwater. The specific name honours the American ichthyologist Tyson R. Roberts.

References

Roberts
Fish described in 1982
Freshwater fish of Papua New Guinea
Taxonomy articles created by Polbot